Colic artery (an artery that serves the colon) may refer to the:
 Ileocolic artery
 Right colic artery
 Middle colic artery
 Left colic artery

The first three are branches of the superior mesenteric artery; the fourth is a branch of the inferior mesenteric artery.